Michael Reese is an American law enforcement officer who served as the 40th sheriff of Multnomah County, Oregon (2016–2022), the county where Portland is located.

Early life and education 
Reese was born in Portland, Oregon and attended Roosevelt High School in North Portland. He went to Mt. Hood Community College and Portland State University where he received his BS in Psychology and his Masters of Public Administration.

Career 
Reese started his career in 1989 as a deputy sheriff with the Multnomah County Sheriff's Office. He transferred to the Portland Police Bureau in 1994, serving as an officer, sergeant, lieutenant, captain, commander and ultimately chief of police, retiring in 2015. He served as interim director of the Citizen's Crime Commission before being appointed to finish former Sheriff Dan Stanton's term in May 2016 (Stanton retired amid a scandal). In 2018, Reese ran unopposed in the sheriff's election, except for a write-in campaign by Teressa Raiford, and received 96.55% of the vote. Reese did not run for re-election in 2022 due to term limits.

Electoral history

References

Year of birth missing (living people)
Living people
Oregon sheriffs
Portland State University alumni
Portland Police Bureau officers
Roosevelt High School (Oregon) alumni